Prall is a surname. Notable people with the surname include:

Anning Smith Prall (1870–1937), representative from New York, born in Port Richmond, Staten Island
David Prall (1886–1940), philosopher of art at the University of California
Horace Griggs Prall (1881–1951), New Jersey attorney and Republican politician
Warren Prall Watters (1890–1992), the founding Archbishop of the Free Church of Antioch (Malabar Rite)
Willie Prall, former Major League Baseball pitcher

See also
Prall's Island, uninhabited island in the Arthur Kill between Staten Island, New York, and Linden, New Jersey, in the United States

German-language surnames